Jeremy Danial Boreing (born February 5, 1979) is an American screenwriter, director, producer, and political commentator. He was a member of Coattails Entertainment, a production company, with Kurt Schemper, Joel David Moore, and Zachary Levi from 2006 to 2010. Boreing was the producer and co-writer of the 2007 horror film Spiral with Moore, as well as Jeff Mizushima's 2009 comedy film Etienne!. After the dissolution of Coattails, Boreing co-founded the independent film studio Declaration Entertainment with Bill Whittle. He was also a guest columnist for the conservative websites Big Hollywood and Newsbusters, and is a founder, contributor and co-chief executive officer at the conservative news and opinion website The Daily Wire. In March 2022, Boreing opened a line of subscription-based shaving razors called Jeremy's Razors, openly competing against former Daily Wire sponsor Harry's Razors.

Career

Early career 
Born in Slaton, Texas, to a Christian family, Boreing started his career at a local historic regional theatre, the Garza, as a writer and producer. In 2002, Boreing met future writing partner Joel David Moore, a friend of a friend, who helped move Moore's couch with his pickup truck. Boreing eventually made the move to Los Angeles in the mid-2000s to work as a film producer and screenwriter. His first job in Hollywood was with Zachary Levi, another friend from Lubbock, and Eric McCormack for a television pilot with Michael C. Forman's Big Cattle Productions.

2006 
In June 2006, Boreing joined Kurt Schemper, Joel David Moore, and Zachary Levi to form Coattails Entertainment, a film production company. He produced and co-wrote the company's first feature film, Spiral, with Moore who also directed alongside Adam Green.

That same year, he produced Jeff Mizushima's comedy film Etienne!

Collaboration with Ben Shapiro 
In 2013, Boreing and Ben Shapiro founded the conservative U.S. media watchdog and activism organization Truth Revolt.

In 2015 Boreing and Shapiro founded The Daily Wire and began producing the first few episodes of The Ben Shapiro Show podcast from Boreing's pool house. Boreing, who serves as co-CEO, is jokingly referred to as the "god-king" of The Daily Wire by staff and fans.

Boreing has been an active contributor behind the scenes for PragerU, which produces conservative internet videos. According to PragerU co-founder Allen Estrin, Boreing "came up with the site's signature visual style after a photographer came after them with a fair-use claim; their solution was to use illustrations instead."

Boreing served as Executive Director of Friends of Abe, a low-profile networking organization for Hollywood conservatives founded by Gary Sinise. During his tenure as executive director, Boreing refused to give the Internal Revenue Service access to the section of the organization's website that would identify its members since such access is not required by federal law.

In November 2021, Bentkey Services, the company for which Boreing serves as the chief executive officer, filed a lawsuit challenging the President Joe Biden OSHA vaccine mandate in federal court in the United States Court of Appeals for the Sixth Circuit. The Supreme Court blocked the policy in a 6-3 ruling in January 2022.

Collaboration with Tim Pool 
In April 2022, Boreing and YouTuber Tim Pool purchased a billboard in Times Square that read "Democracy dies in darkness. That's why we're shining a light on you. Taylor Lorenz doxxed @Libs of TikTok." In response, Lorenz called the billboard "so idiotic it's hilarious".

Filmography 
As producer

As writer

As director

As actor

References

External links 
 
 
 
 

1979 births
Film producers from California
American male screenwriters
American film studio executives
Living people
People from Slaton, Texas
Writers from Los Angeles
The Daily Wire people
Screenwriters from California
Screenwriters from Texas
Film producers from Texas